Milton Queiroz da Paixão, simply known as Tita (born 1 April 1958), is a Brazilian former association footballer who played as a forward. He played for the Brazil national team and played for several Campeonato Brasileiro Série A clubs. After retiring, he started a managerial career.

Personal life
He is a member of the Church of Jesus Christ of Latter-day Saints.

Playing career
He was capped 32 times for the national team, between August 1979 and May 1990, scoring six goals. He played 391 games and scored 135 goals for Flamengo. With Bayer Leverkusen, he won the UEFA Cup in 1988. He scored in the second leg of the final against Espanyol, one of three goals needed to equal a 3–0 deficit.

Managerial career
Tita has also managed several different clubs. In 2008, he was Vasco da Gama's manager from August to September.

Managerial statistics

Honours

Clubs
Rio State Championship 1978, 1979, 1979 Special, 1981, 1987
Brazilian National Championship 1980, 1982, 1983, 1989
Copa Libertadores 1981, 1983
Intercontinental Cup 1981, 1983
Rio Grande do Sul State Championship 1985
UEFA Cup 1988
Mexican League 1992
Guatemalan League 1998

International
1983 Copa América – Runner-up
1987 Pan American Games' Football Tournament – Winner
1989 Copa América – Winner
1990 FIFA World Cup – Round of 16

References

External links
 
 Leverkusen who's who
 
 
 
 

1958 births
Living people
Brazilian Latter Day Saints
Footballers from Rio de Janeiro (city)
Brazilian footballers
Brazilian football managers
Brazilian expatriate footballers
Brazilian expatriate football managers
Expatriate footballers in West Germany
Expatriate footballers in Italy
Expatriate footballers in Mexico
Expatriate footballers in Guatemala
Expatriate football managers in Japan
Expatriate soccer managers in the United States
Expatriate football managers in Mexico
Campeonato Brasileiro Série A players
Bundesliga players
Serie A players
Serie B players
Liga MX players
1979 Copa América players
1983 Copa América players
1989 Copa América players
1990 FIFA World Cup players
Copa Libertadores-winning players
Copa América-winning players
Campeonato Brasileiro Série A managers
Campeonato Brasileiro Série C managers
J1 League managers
Brazil international footballers
CR Flamengo footballers
Grêmio Foot-Ball Porto Alegrense players
Sport Club Internacional players
CR Vasco da Gama players
Bayer 04 Leverkusen players
Delfino Pescara 1936 players
Club León footballers
Club Puebla players
Comunicaciones F.C. players
CR Vasco da Gama managers
Americano Futebol Clube managers
Urawa Red Diamonds managers
America Football Club (RJ) managers
Bangu Atlético Clube managers
Sociedade Esportiva e Recreativa Caxias do Sul managers
Clube do Remo managers
Resende Futebol Clube managers
Tupi Football Club managers
Macaé Esporte Futebol Clube managers
América Futebol Clube (RN) managers
Volta Redonda Futebol Clube managers
Club León managers
Club Necaxa managers
Association football forwards
UEFA Cup winning players
Brazilian expatriate sportspeople in Italy
Brazilian expatriate sportspeople in West Germany
Brazilian expatriate sportspeople in Mexico
Brazilian expatriate sportspeople in Guatemala
Brazilian expatriate sportspeople in the United States
Brazilian expatriate sportspeople in Japan